United States ex rel. Accardi v. Shaughnessy, 347 U.S. 260 (1954), is a landmark United States Supreme Court case, in administrative law, in which the Court held that administrative agencies in the Federal Government are obliged to follow their own regulations, policies and procedures. Under the Accardi Doctrine, federal agencies which do not follow their own regulations or procedures run the risk of having their actions invalidated if challenged in court. 

The Accardi doctrine was later strengthened in Service v. Dulles 354 US 363 (1957)  and Vitarelli v. Seaton, 359 US 535 (1959)  

Due to a ruling in United States v. Fausto,  the doctrine generally does not apply to Federal employment decisions that are covered by the Civil Service Reform Act of 1978.

References

External links
 

1954 in United States case law
United States administrative case law
United States Supreme Court cases
United States Supreme Court cases of the Warren Court